Taylor Hawkins & The Coattail Riders was an American rock band founded by Taylor Hawkins, drummer for Foo Fighters. Hawkins was the drummer and vocalist for the trio. Other band members have included Chris Chaney on bass, Gannin Arnold on guitar and support vocals, and Nate Wood on guitar and support vocals. Chaney and Hawkins had previously played in Alanis Morissette's tour band, Sexual Chocolate. The Coattail Riders disbanded when Hawkins died on March 25, 2022.

History
The project was launched when Hawkins started recording a few songs at a home studio owned by a friend, Drew Hester. This ended up spawning a band, with Taylor Hawkins on vocals.

Debut album
On March 21, 2006, the band released their self-titled debut album. It featured eleven songs, which were recorded in 2004, before Foo Fighters started recording In Your Honor. Their first official video was of the first song off the album, "Louise".

Red Light Fever
In an interview with The Rock Radio website regarding the next album in September 2009, Taylor Hawkins stated that recording and production had been completed, but that they had yet to decide on a title or release date.

In February 2010, the album was announced. Titled Red Light Fever, it was to be released on April 19. It features guest musicians Brian May and Roger Taylor of Queen, Dave Grohl of Foo Fighters, and Elliot Easton of The Cars. It was recorded at the Foo Fighters' Studio 606 in California.

Get the Money
On November 8, 2019, the band released their third album, Get the Money. The first single, "Crossed the Line", was released on October 15, 2019, and features Dave Grohl and Yes frontman, Jon Davison. The video for the single "I Really Blew It" features Grohl and Perry Farrell.

Taylor Hawkins' death
On March 25, 2022, Hawkins died in Bogota, Colombia, while on tour with Foo Fighters.

On September 3, 2022, the Coattail Riders performed at the Taylor Hawkins Tribute Concert at Wembley Stadium. They were joined onstage by Justin Hawkins of The Darkness as well as drummer Josh Freese.

Discography
 Taylor Hawkins & The Coattail Riders (2006)
 Red Light Fever (2010)
 Get the Money (2019)

References

External links
 

2004 establishments in California
2022 disestablishments in California
American alternative rock groups
American musical trios
Musical groups established in 2004
Musical groups disestablished in 2022